Gaur Gopal Das  is an Indian monk, lifestyle coach, motivational speaker and former electrical engineer. He is a member of the International Society for Krishna Consciousness (ISKCON).

Biography
Gaur Gopal Das was born in Wambori town in Ahmadnagar District, Maharashtra, India. He has a diploma in electrical engineering from Cusrow Wadia Institute of Technology, Pune and a degree from College of Engineering, Pune. He worked as an electrical engineer at Hewlett Packard for a brief period, before leaving the company in 1996 to become a monk.

In 2018, he published the book Life's Amazing Secrets, and received an honorary doctorate by Kalinga Institute of Industrial Technology (KIIT). He was reported as having over 4.36 million YouTube followers with more than 177 million views.

Published works

References

External links
 Gaur Gopal Das at Penguin India

Living people
Hindu monks
International Society for Krishna Consciousness religious figures
1973 births